Fire Arrow or variation, may refer to:

Weaponry
 Fire arrow, a rocket propelled arrow
 Flaming arrow, a burning arrow used to cause fires
 Bo-hiya (Japanese fire arrow), used by samurai
 Rocket (firework), also called "fire arrow"

Entertainment
 Agneyaasthram (1972 poem) by Chemmanam Chacko
 The Fire Arrow (1989 film) written and directed by Kang Dae-ha
 The Fire Arrow (2006 novel) novel by Richard S. Wheeler

Other uses
 Plymouth Fire Arrow (1970s car), a sedan from Chrysler

See also

 
 
 
 Flaming Arrow (disambiguation)
 Arrow (disambiguation)
 Fire (disambiguation)

Disambiguation pages